The 1982–83 season was Atlético Madrid's 42nd season since foundation in 1903 and the club's 38th season in La Liga, the top league of Spanish football. Atlético competed in La Liga, and the Copa del Rey.

Squad

Transfers

In

Out

Results

La Liga

Position by round

League table

Matches

Copa del Rey

First round

Second round

Third round

Copa de La Liga

Eightfinals

Quarterfinals

Semifinals

Squad statistics

Players statistics

References

External links
 Official website

Atlético Madrid seasons
Atlético Madrid